The women's 400 metres hurdles event at the 2002 Commonwealth Games was held on 27–28 July.

Medalists

Results

Heats
Qualification: First 3 of each heat (Q) and the next 2 fastest (q) qualified for the final.

Final

References
Official results
Results at BBC

Hurdles
2002
2002 in women's athletics